The Copa do Brasil 1991 was the 3rd staging of the Copa do Brasil.

The competition started on February 9, 1991, and concluded on June 2, 1991, with the second leg of the final, held at the Estádio Heriberto Hülse in Criciúma, in which Criciúma lifted the trophy for the first time with a 0-0 draw with Grêmio.

Gérson, of Atlético Mineiro, with 6 goals, was the competition's topscorer.

Format
The competition was disputed by 32 clubs in a knock-out format where all rounds were played in two legs and the away goals rule was used.

Competition stages

References
 Copa do Brasil 1991 at RSSSF

1991
1991 in Brazilian football
1991 domestic association football cups